Crinia is a genus of frog, native to Australia, and part of the family Myobatrachidae. It consists of small frogs, which are distributed throughout most of Australia, excluding the central arid regions. Many of the species within this genus are non-distinguishable through physical characteristics, and can only be distinguished by their calls.

They have unwebbed toes and fingers, most of the species in these genus are polymorphic - meaning that several variations of colour and skin patterning exist in a single population and all species lay their eggs in small clumps in water.

The generic name Crinia likely derives from the Greek verb κρῑνω (krīnō) "to separate" as a reference to the frog's unwebbed digits, meaning "separated (toes)". Although Johann Jakob von Tschudi did not provide an etymology in 1838, he cited the frog's "free toes" (without webbing) as an important distinctive feature (most frogs have webbed feet).

During the 1950s, 1960s and 1970s a lot of taxonomic work was done on this genus, frogs that were originally thought to be common eastern froglets (Crinia signifera) were described as other species of Crinia by mating call analysis and hybridization experiments. Two species originally described as Crinia were then placed in their own genus, Assa and Paracrinia. One species of both Geocrinia and Taudactylus were split from Crinia and the genus Bryobatrachus was also described only to be recently placed back into Crinia. The moss froglet, (Crinia nimbus) is very different physically and in its tadpole development. Due to the obvious differences with other species in Crinia this species is likely to be placed again into a separate genus.

Species
The genus Crinia contains 17 species:

References

Amphibian Species of the World - Crinia Tschudi, 1838
Australian Government Department of the Environment and Heritage

Tschudi, Johann J. von (1838). Classification der Batrachier, mit Berücksichtigung der fossilen Tiere dieser Abteilung der Reptilien. Neuchâtel : Erück Petitpierre pp. 102.

 
Myobatrachidae
Amphibians of Australia
Amphibian genera
Taxa named by Johann Jakob von Tschudi